The 2001–02 Ukrainian Second League was the 11th season of 3rd level professional football in Ukraine.

The competitions were divided into three groups according to geographical location in the country – A is western Ukraine, B is southern Ukraine and Crimea, and C is eastern Ukraine.

The groups were won respectively by FC Krasyliv, FC Systema-Boreks Borodianka and FC Sumy.

Team changes

Promoted
The following team was promoted from the 2001 Ukrainian Football Amateur League:
 FC Kovel-Volyn-2 – (debut)
 FC SKA-Orbita Lviv – (debut)
 FC Dnister Ovidiopol – (debut)
 FC Stal Dniprodzerzhynsk – (debut, previously (16 seasons ago) played in the 1985 Soviet Second League as Metalurh Dniprodzerzhynsk)

The 2000 Ukrainian Football Amateur League participant:
 FC Akademiya Irpin – (debut)

Also, eight more club was admitted additionally:
 FC Zakarpattia-2 Uzhhorod – (debut)
 FC Borysfen-2 Boryspil – (debut)
 FC Metalurh-2 Donetsk – (debut)
 FC Obolon-2 Kyiv – (returning after absence of a season)
 FC Chornohora Ivano-Frankivsk– (debut, replacing relegated FC Prykarpattia-2 Ivano-Frankivsk)
 FC Chaika-VMS Sevastopol – (returning after an absence of 6 seasons)
 FC Torpedo Zaporizhzhia – (debut, previously (10 seasons ago) played in the 1991 Soviet Second League as Torpedo Zaporizhzhia)
 FC Dynamo Simferopol – (debut)

Relegated
 FC Bukovyna Chernivtsi – (returning after an absence of a season)
 FC Cherkasy – (returning after an absence of 8 seasons, previously as Dnipro Cherkasy)
 FC Spartak Sumy – (returning after an absence of 7 seasons, previously as Yavir Krasnopillia)

Withdrawn
 FC Adoms Kremenchuk, withdrew before the season
 FC Ternopil, being a farm team of FC Nyva Ternopil, it is forced relegation as Nyva was relegated to the league for the next season
 FC Dnipro-3 Dnipropetrovsk was forced into relegation due to relegation of FC Dnipro-2 Dnipropetrovsk
 FC Chaika-VMS Sevastopol, was replaced for the next season with FC Sevastopol
 FC Frunzenets-Liha-99 Sumy was merged with FC Sumy
 FC Tsementnyk-Khorda Mykolaiv withdrew during winter break
 FC Dynamo Lviv, withdrew after the season
 FC SKA-Orbita Lviv, withdrew after the season
 FC Zakarpattia-2 Uzhhorod, withdrew after the season
 FC Portovyk Illichivsk, withdrew after the season
 FC Cherkasy, withdrew after the season
 FC Mashynobudivnyk Druzhkivka, withdrew after the season
 FC Oskil Kupyansk, withdrew after the relegation

Renamed / Relocated
 FC Kalush changed its name to FC Lukor Kalush
 FC Kovel-Volyn changed its name to FC Kovel-Volyn-2
 FC Akademiya Irpin changed its name to FC Nafkom-Akademiya Irpin
 FC Ternopil-Nyva-2 changed its name to FC Ternopil
 FC Rihonda Bila Tserkva changed its name to FC Ros Bila Tserkva
 FC Spartak Sumy changed its name to FC Sumy
 FC Karpaty-2 changed its name to FC Karpaty-3 Lviv 
FC Lviv (1992) in the First League after merger changed to Karpaty-2
 FC Hazovyk Komarno moved to Stryi and changed its name to FC Hazovyk-Skala Stryi

Group A

Location map

Final standings

Top goalscorers

Group B

Location map

Final standings

Top goalscorers

Group C

Location map

Final standings

Top goalscorers

External links
 2001-02 season by Oleksiy Kobyzev

Ukrainian Second League seasons
3
Ukra